South Essex College of Further and Higher Education, also known as South Essex College, is a further education college located over three main sites in Basildon, Southend-on-Sea and Grays in Essex, England. The college provides courses for students of all ages, from 14 to 19-year-olds to undergraduates, adults and businesses.

History
The college was founded in 1899 as an art school and was renamed later as the Junior Day Technical School, then being restructured to include in its teaching commercial and industrial skills for education in courses like plumbing. The college became South East Essex College of Arts and Technology (SEECAT) in 1991.

In 2004, the college relocated to a £52 million campus in the centre of Southend, close to main public transport routes and right next to the High Street and mainline railway station. The college formally merged with Thurrock and Basildon College on 1 January 2010 and was renamed South Essex College.

In 2013 The Forum Southend-on-Sea opened which has a dedicated South Essex College area on the third floor.

In 2014 the Thurrock campus relocated to a £45 million building in the centre of Grays.

The college is seeking to relocate its Basildon campus to the town centre in the future.

In June 2018 it was announced that South Essex College would merge with PROCAT, a specialist engineering and construction provider based in Basildon, Canvey Island and Ilford. The new Stephenson Road campus of South Essex College was opened under the PROCAT brand.

In December 2021  it was announced that South Essex College had won Institute of Technology status in wave two in part of a government education plan to improve higher technical training in subjects such as advanced manufacturing, digital and cyber security, aerospace and healthcare.

Courses
South Essex College's Further Education provision includes a wide range of A-levels and vocational courses such as BTECs and apprenticeships. The college offers a range of higher education course including degrees, HNCs and HNDs. Programmes are validated by University of the Arts London and Pearson. The college also offers services to businesses through its Business Development Team and offers apprenticeship training.

South Essex College offers Paediatric First Aid Qualifications via Omnia Training Solutions. This partnership was set up to ensure Students hold Qualifications to meet requirements under the Early years foundation stage statutory framework (EYFS), and OFSTED when entering the workplace.

Campuses

Southend Campus 
The Southend Campus is located in the heart of Southend-on-Sea town centre, next to Southend Central railway station.

The college’s building in Southend was featured in the Learning and Skills Council publication 'World Class Buildings – Design Quality in Further Education' in March 2005 and ‘Better Buildings, Better Design, Better Education’ published by the Department for Education and Skills in 2007. It won a British Constructional Steelwork Association Structural Steel Award and was a finalist in the RIBA/LSC Further Education Awards in 2006.

It has  of space with an atrium accommodating a 250-seat auditorium within the ‘Performance Pod’, dining decks, viewing balconies and social, meeting and event areas.

Beauty Therapy students are taught at the Beauty Academy in Queens Road, a few minutes' walk from the main campus. It also offers treatments to the general public. The College also offers purpose-built sports facilities at Wellstead Gardens in Westcliff-on-Sea, with a gym and playing fields for team sports.

The Southend Campus also played host to a world record attempt in 2014 where two students (Alex Holland-Martin & Simon Turp) tried to break the longest radio show broadcast record. The pair were on air for 88 hours.

Basildon Campus 
The Basildon Campus is situated just outside Basildon Town Centre. It specialises in vocational courses ranging from science, hairdressing, health and social care, public services and sport.

The Campus offers realistic work environments such as motor vehicle workshops. For those studying animal care, an animal-management centre is on-campus.

Thurrock Campus 
In 2014 the Thurrock Campus relocated to a £45 million building in the centre of Grays. The campus offers specialist workshops linked to courses for construction, engineering, media and creative arts in addition to facilities for logistics, childcare, health and social care and courses. There is an outdoor amphitheatre.

The Forum Southend-on-Sea 
The Forum Southend-on-Sea is a £27 million modern library and learning zone located opposite the Southend Campus. South Essex College is a partner in this venture with the University of Essex and Southend Council. The Forum houses a library collection on the first floor and a dedicated South Essex College area on the third floor. As well as hosting most of Higher Education resources, The Forum supports the delivery of the college's HE courses. Students have access to a large range of books and resources as well as around 100 computers and Wi-Fi access. Other areas in the Forum include a University of Essex floor, the Focal Point Art Gallery, a 200-seat lecture theatre and refreshment facilities.

Notable alumni

 Walé Adeyemi, British-Nigerian fashion designer
 James Bourne, singer in Busted/McBusted
 Dave Gahan, singer, composer and vocalist from Depeche Mode
 Toby Gard, creator of Lara Croft
 Ross Kemp, BAFTA award-winning actor
 Spencer Livermore, Labour peer and former Director of Strategy to Prime Minister Gordon Brown
 Alison Moyet, singer
 Ethan Payne (Behzinga), YouTuber, co-founding member of the Sidemen
 Maisie Smith, EastEnders actress
Ricky Champ,       EastEnders   actor

See also
 South East Essex Technical College

References

External links
South Essex College website

Educational institutions established in 1899
Education in Southend-on-Sea
Further education colleges in Essex
University of Essex
Art schools in England
Defunct art schools
Education in Thurrock
1899 establishments in England
Buildings and structures in Southend-on-Sea
Further education colleges in the Collab Group